Glenn William Howard (born July 17, 1962) is a Canadian curler who is one of the most decorated curlers of all time.  He has won four world championships, four Briers and 17 Ontario provincial championships, including a record eight straight, from 2006 to 2013. Through 2017, he has played in 218 games at the Brier, more than any other curler in history. He has also won the 2001 TSN Skins Game.

Career

Juniors
Howard lost two straight Ontario Junior Championship finals in 1980 and 1981, skipping a rink out of Midland, Ontario. In both events there were no playoffs, but a tie for first place after the round robin forced a tiebreaker. In 1980 he lost to John Kawaja and in 1981, he lost to John Base. Howard won the 1984 Ontario University Athletics Association title skipping the University of Waterloo curling team.

1985–2006
Howard had a lot of success in his early career when he played third with his brother, Russ. With Russ, Howard won the 1987 and 1993 Labatt Briers, and brought home gold from the 1987 and 1993 World Championships. However, Russ would move to New Brunswick in the late 1990s, leaving Glenn in Ontario to form his own team. Glenn did return to play for his brother at the 2001 Canadian Olympic Curling Trials.

Glenn would be unsuccessful in returning to the Brier, losing back-to-back provincial finals (2004, 2005) until 2006 when he would triumph over former teammate Wayne Middaugh in the Ontario final. This qualified him for the 2006 Tim Hortons Brier. His team of third Richard Hart, second Brent Laing, and lead Craig Savill dominated the 2006 Brier, finishing the round robin with only one loss.  However, the team was not successful in the final, losing to Quebec's Jean-Michel Ménard 8–7.

2007–2014
Howard's team dominated the 2007 season. The team marched right through the provincial championships without losing a single game (none even going a complete ten ends). At the 2007 Tim Hortons Brier, the team lost just one round-robin game to Alberta's Kevin Martin. The team lost another in the Page playoff 1 vs. 2 game to Olympic gold medalist Brad Gushue of Newfoundland and Labrador. However, in the re-match in the final, Howard beat Gushue 10–6. Howard's team continued its dominance at the 2007 Ford World Men's Curling Championship. The team lost just one game in the round-robin to Team USA (skipped by Todd Birr). However, it avenged this loss by beating the Americans 7–2 in the Page playoff game and then winning the final over the Germans skipped by Andy Kapp 8–3.

In his attempt to repeat at the 2008 Tim Hortons Brier, Howard lost 5–4 in the final to Alberta, skipped by Kevin Martin.

Howard became only the second skip to win a career Grand Slam when he won the Canadian Open in 2009.

Howard again qualified for the 2009 Tim Hortons Brier in Calgary. Many were looking forward to Howard's performance at the Brier. Firstly, his older brother Russ was skipping the New Brunswick team, and secondly, a re-match with the rival Kevin Martin team. Howard's rink finished the round robin in second place with a 9-2 record. His last match of the round robin was against Martin, as was the first playoff matchup. Both games Howard lost, but were widely considered two of the most entertaining games in curling history, due to the incredible shot making. Howard would lose his next playoff game as well, to Jeff Stoughton's Manitoba rink, disappointing those who wanted to see a third straight exciting Martin vs Howard show down. Despite all of this, Howard is probably most remembered at the 2009 Brier for one of the greatest shots in curling history. In a round robin match against Saskatchewan, Howard was down by two with his last shot of the game. He only had one shot to win the game. Howard was facing two Saskatchewan stones, which were too far apart and too even to take out both. Howard had three rocks in the 12 foot. With his rock, Howard knocked one of his rocks onto another of his rocks, deflecting into one of the Saskatchewan stones, removing it while sticking, while his shooter rock had ricocheted off the first Ontario rock onto the other Saskatchewan stone, taking it out as well, while sticking too. With those two Ontario rocks, plus the other one that remained stationary, Ontario scored three to win the game. (See video) The shot would even be mentioned by Chris Plys on The Colbert Report during a curling segment.

Howard clinched a spot at the 2009 Olympic Trials when he won the 2008 Tylenol Players' Championship, which was held in St. John's, Newfoundland and Labrador. Howard finished the tournament with a perfect record and beat Kevin Martin in the final.

At the 2010 Brier, Howard finished the round robin with an undefeated 11–0 record, but lost in the Final to Alberta's Kevin Koe. He finished the year with a semifinal loss to Niklas Edin at the 2011 Players' Championship. At the end of the season, longtime third Richard Hart announced that he would leave Team Howard and the world of competitive curling. Former teammate Wayne Middaugh replaced Hart.

At the 2012 World Championship, Howard defeated Scotland in the Final to capture his 4th world title.

At the 2013 Brier, Howard would once again represent the province of Ontario. Howard and team would go 10-1 in the Round Robin, giving themselves a spot in the Page 1-2 game. Team Howard would go on to lose to Manitoba's Jeff Stoughton in the page playoff and to eventual Brier champion, Northern Ontario's Brad Jacobs in the semi final.

By being the CTRS leader for the 2011-2012 season, Glenn Howard clinched a spot in 2013 Canadian Olympic Curling Trials. Howard would end up missing the playoffs, finishing 2-5 and in a tie for 6th place with Kevin Koe. Glenn Howard would go on to play in the 2014 Ontario Provincials and lose to Greg Balsdon in the final. Before losing to Balsdon, Howard had won eight-straight provincial championships.

2014–present
At the end of the 2013–2014 season, Glenn Howard announced that second Brent Laing would be leaving the team and going to Alberta to join with Kevin Koe's new rink. On April 13, via his Twitter account, Glenn Howard announced his new team would consist of former third Richard Hart, Jon Mead, and maintaining lead Craig Savill. The team would not have much success in their lone season together, failing to even qualify for the provincial championships.

For the 2015–16 curling season, Wayne Middaugh joined the team once again, as did Glenn's son, Scott Howard, with Savill leaving the team. Middaugh left the team mid-season following a skiing incident and was replaced by Adam Spencer. The team won the 2016 Ontario Tankard and represented Ontario at the 2016 Tim Hortons Brier. At the Brier, Howard led Ontario to a 4–7 round robin record.

In 2016, David Mathers joined the team at second, with Middaugh retiring from the game. The rink won the 2017 Ontario Tankard, Howard's record 17th provincial championship. At the 2017 Tim Hortons Brier, Howard led his Ontario foursome to a 4–7 record.

In 2017, Hart retired from professional curling, and was replaced by Adam Spencer. The rink played in the 2017 Olympic Pre-Trials. They went 6–0 in round robin play, but were eliminated in the playoffs, making it as far as the "B" final, ending the team's Olympic qualifying run.

At the 2018 Winter Olympics, Howard coached the Great Britain Women's Curling team (skipped by Eve Muirhead), who reached the semi-finals at the expense of their Canadian counterparts; Howard said, "Too bad Canada were knocked out, but we've got a job to do and I'm really proud of the girls". Howard has been coaching the Muirhead rink ever since.

In 2018, Tim March joined the team at lead, with son Scott replacing Spencer at third.

Howard currently coaches the Jennifer Jones women's curling team.

Personal life
Howard works for Brewers Retail Inc. as a consultant and spokesperson. He currently resides in Tiny, Ontario. He is married and has two children, who are both curlers themselves, Scott and Carly. Howard made a guest appearance on the CBC comedy Little Mosque on the Prairie on the season 2 episode titled "Jihad on Ice". In the Fall of 2013, he was inducted into the Penetanguishene Sports Hall of Fame.

Career statistics

Grand Slam record

Teams

Notes

See also
 List of University of Waterloo people

References

External links

 Team Glenn Howard Website

1962 births
Brier champions
Curlers from Simcoe County
Living people
People from Midland, Ontario
People from Penetanguishene
World curling champions
Canadian male curlers
Canadian curling coaches
Canada Cup (curling) participants
University of Waterloo alumni